Oneonta is a city in Blount County, Alabama, United States. At the 2020 census, the population was 6,938. The city is the county seat of Blount County. Oneonta is home to the Covered Bridge Festival.

History
A post office called Oneonta has been in operation since 1889. The city was named after Oneonta, New York, the native home of a railroad official. In 1889, the county seat was transferred to Oneonta from Blountsville.

During World War II, a small POW camp was operated outside of Oneonta.

Geography
Oneonta is located in eastern Blount County at 33°56'32.291" North, 86°28'43.586" West (33.942303, -86.478774). It is situated in Murphree Valley between Red Mountain and Sand Mountain to the northwest and Straight Mountain to the southeast.

U.S. Route 231 passes through the center of the city, leading northwest  to Cleveland, Alabama, and southeast  to Interstate 59 in Ashville.

Climate

Demographics

2020 census

As of the 2020 United States census, there were 6,938 people, 2,565 households, and 1,551 families residing in the city.

2010 census
As of the census of 2010, there were 6,567 people, 2,502 households, and 1,630 families residing in the city. The racial makeup of the city was 84.1% White, 6.0% Black or African American, 0.5% Native American, 0.5% Asian, 7.6% from other races, and 1.3% from two or more races. 15.9% of the population were Hispanic or Latino of any race.

There were 2,502 households, out of which 28.4% had children under the age of 18 living with them, 49.9% were married couples living together, 11.0% had a female householder with no husband present, and 34.9% were non-families. 31.4% of all households were made up of individuals, and 15.3% had someone living alone who was 65 years of age or older. The average household size was 2.46 and the average family size was 3.11.

In the city, the age distribution of the population shows 23.0% under the age of 18, 7.8% from 18 to 24, 24.7% from 25 to 44, 23.8% from 45 to 64, and 20.7% who were 65 years of age or older. The median age was 40.5 years. For every 100 females, there were 91.0 males. For every 100 females age 18 and over, there were 101.3 males.

The median income for a household in the city was $40,192, and the median income for a family was $50,236. Males had a median income of $41,425 versus $22,160 for females. The per capita income for the city was $18,951. About 13.0% of families and 17.9% of the population were below the poverty line, including 27.2% of those under age 18 and 16.4% of those age 65 or over.

City government

The city government is made up of Mayor Richard Phillips and a five-person city council —Judy Underwood, Sherry Pierce, Donald Bradley, Lee Alexander, and Robbie McAlpine.
 City Manager: 
 City Clerk: Amanda Stanfield
 Mayor: Edwin Gerardo Chavez
 Police Chief Charles Clifton
 Fire Chief Kenny Booth

Attractions
Oneonta, Alabama is home to the historical Covered Bridge Festival. This annual event showcases the history of the remaining covered bridges in Blount County, and includes an arts and crafts festival with entertainment and events. Also located in Oneonta is the Blount County Memorial Museum which hosts a variety of resources for genealogy research. Palisades Park features hiking trails and public campgrounds. The Oneonta Business Association sponsors the annual summertime festival known as the June Fling with over 100 booths, cruise-in, entertainment, Kidz Fun Zone, and the Singing Showdown solo vocal competition. This non-profit organization heads other projects including "Paint the Town," "Light the Town," and the Festival of Lights.

Education

Public education is provided by Oneonta City Schools. There are three schools in the city: Oneonta Elementary School (grades K through 5), Oneonta Middle School (grades 6 through 8), and Oneonta High School (grades 9 through 12). A branch of Wallace State Community College is also located in the town.

Radio stations
 WCRL 1570 AM – Oldies (simulcasts on translator W237DH 95.3FM)

Notable people

 Joe Gibbs, co-founder of the Golf Channel
 Osmond Ingram, sailor in the United States Navy during World War I who posthumously received the Medal of Honor
 Steve Patton, head coach of the Gardner–Webb University football team from 1997–2010
 Rusty Paul, 2nd Mayor of Sandy Springs, Georgia.
 Kevin Sherrer, football coach

References

External links
 
 Blount County-Oneonta Chamber of Commerce
 Oneonta City Schools
 Oneonta Business Association

Cities in Alabama
Cities in Blount County, Alabama
County seats in Alabama
Birmingham metropolitan area, Alabama
Alabama placenames of Native American origin